Kincsem Park is a major horse racing venue in Budapest, Hungary. The 84-hectare park, named after the racehorse Kincsem, can accommodate thoroughbred racing and harness racing, and can also be configured as a concert venue. Although the track experienced a drop in attendance in recent years, it has enjoyed new popularity among racing fans due to the success of Hungarian racehorse Overdose. In August 2009, Madonna performed in front of a sold-out crowd of 41,000 fans as a part of her Sticky & Sweet Tour.

Gallery

Notable races 

Thoroughbred races
 Káposztásmegyeri Prix
 Hazafi Prix
 Batthyány Prix
 Hunyady Prix
 Nemzeti Prix
 Millenniumi Prix
 Alagi Prix
 Magyar Kanca Prix
 Magyar Derby
 Kozma Ferenc Memorial Race
 Szent István Prix
 Kincsem Prix
 Imperiál Prix
 Gróf Károlyi Gyula Memorial Race
 Gróf Széchenyi István Memorial Race
 Magyar St. Leger
 Szent László Prix
 Budapesti Prix
 Kállai Pál Memorial Race
 Kétévesek Kritériuma
 Lovaregyleti Prix

Harness races
 Tavaszi Handicap
 Bródy János Memorial Race
 Pulay Kornél Memorial Race
 Májusi Grand Prix
 Ferge László Memorial Race
 Nemzeti Prix
 Négyévesek Grand Prix
 Lovasélet Sprinter Cup
 Kanca Prix
 Szalay János Memorial Race
 Dr. Vecseklőy József Memorial Race
 Derby Kísérleti Race
 F.V.M. Prix
 Magyar Ügetőderby
 Pannónia Prix
 Szent István Prix
 Marschall József Memorial Race
 Hungária Prix
 Őszi Kanca Prix
 Kétévesek Grand Prix
 Köztársásági Prix
 Őszi Kísérleti Race
 Ménesek Prix
 Baka Handicap

References

External links
Kincsem Park web site (in Hungarian)
Aerial photographs

Sports venues in Budapest
Horse racing venues in Hungary
Music venues in Hungary
Cross country running venues